Incheon City Hall Station is a subway station on Line 1 and Line 2 of the Incheon Subway located at 927 Ganseok-dong,  Jiha264, Yesullo, Namdong-gu, Incheon, South Korea.

Station layout

Exits

References

Namdong District
Seoul Metropolitan Subway stations
Railway stations in South Korea opened in 1999
Metro stations in Incheon